The Darling Downs Institute of Advanced Education (DDIAE) was a tertiary education facility offering undergraduate (Bachelor level and below) degrees and certificates in Toowoomba, Queensland Australia, from the 1967 until it was elevated to University College status (1990) and later University status (1992) as the University of Southern Queensland.

DDIAE was originally a campus of the Queensland Institute of Technology (later Queensland University of Technology).

In order to attract staff, DDIAE offered life tenure contracts in the 1960s, even to comparatively junior staff.  Many of these early staff remained at Darling Heights until they retired in the late 1990s and early years of the 21st Century.

Loss of the Administration Centre to fire in c. April 1979 has meant not only a loss of historical material, but great difficulty in tracing and verifying graduates from the early days.

Public schools in Queensland
Toowoomba